Pimelea nivea is a species of flowering plant in the family Thymelaeaceae and is endemic to Tasmania. It is an erect shrub with densely hairy young stems, elliptic to round leaves arranged in opposite pairs, and compact clusters of white or cream-coloured flowers.

Description
The upper surface of the leaves is glabrous and the lower surface is densely covered with white hairs. The flowers are arranged in large numbers on the ends of the branches in compact clusters. Flowering occurs from September to February.

Taxonomy
Pimelea nivea was first formally described in 1805 by Jacques Labillardière in his book Novae Hollandiae Plantarum Specimen. The specific epithet (nivea) means "snowy" or "snow-white".

Distribution and habitat
This pimelea mainly grows on rocky hillslopes and is found in the Devonport-Waterhouse and between Hobart and South West Cape, where it is common an widespread.

References

nivea
Malvales of Australia
Taxa named by Jacques Labillardière
Plants described in 1805